Lloyd Morey (January 15, 1886September 29, 1965) was an American educator and interim Illinois Auditor of Public Accounts (1956–1957).

Born in Laddonia, Missouri, Morey went to the Gem City Business College in Quincy, Illinois. He then received his bachelor's degrees in English and music from University of Illinois Urbana-Champaign. He worked at the University of Illinois as a bookkeeper, comptroller and eventually became president of the University of Illinois system in 1954 retiring in 1955. In July 1956, the Governor of Illinois named Morey Illinois Auditor of Public Accounts and he served until January 1956. Morey died in Champaign, Illinois of a heart attack on September 29, 1965.

Notes

1886 births
1965 deaths
20th-century American politicians
Auditors of Public Accounts of Illinois
Leaders of the University of Illinois
People from Audrain County, Missouri
University of Illinois Urbana-Champaign alumni
20th-century American academics